Turrini is an Italian surname. Notable people with the surname include:

 Diego Turrini, an Italian astrophysicist and planetologist for whom the minor planet 11803 Turrini is named
 Federico Turrini, Italian swimmer
 Francesco Turrini (born 1965), Italian footballer and manager
 Giordano Turrini (born 1942), Italian cyclist
 Peter Turrini (born 1944), Austrian playwright

See also 
 Turi Turini (disambiguation)
 Turini (disambiguation)
 Torrini (disambiguation)

Italian-language surnames